Mariana Botas Limas (born January 29, 1990) is a Mexican actress and singer known for her role of "Martina López González" in Una familia de diez.

Filmography

Television roles

References

External links

21st-century Mexican actresses
Living people
1990 births